Gurley Novelty or simply Gurley was a candle-making company that existed throughout the second half of the 20th century. Gurley was known for making small, figurine-shaped candles for the main holidays, most notably Christmas, Thanksgiving, and Halloween.  The company was owned by Franklin Gurley, who also designed the candles. Gurley candles have become popular collectible items.

Company history
The company started out in Buffalo, New York in the 1939 as part of candlemaker Franklin Gurley's W&F Manufacturing Co. Inc. At first the Gurley line was commissioned by the Socony-Vacuum Oil Company (now ExxonMobil) as a way to reuse excess paraffin produced as a by-product of the oil refinery process. Gurley's first products were marketed under the name Tavern. The product line consisted of wax lips and teeth, as well as a limited number of small candle figures in holiday shapes such as ghosts, pilgrims, and Santa Claus. By the late 1940s the company's business was almost exclusively novelty candles. In 1949 Franklin Gurley bought the rights to the Tavern brand, and changed the name to the Gurley Novelty Co.

Under the Gurley Novelty Co. name the company continued to manufacture the small wax figures that had made it prosperous. Most candles were manufactured for specific holiday themes.  Though each candle came with a wick, they were not marketed as practical candles. Rather, most were purchased as small wax figures for holiday display.  Smaller candles were sold individually out of shallow cardboard boxes. Sets, and larger candles were sold in sealed paper boxes. Beginning in the 1960s the two and three-candle sets, and larger candles, were generally sold shrink-wrapped in  cellophane. Most candles had a round paper Gurley label attached to the bottom.

Tavern and Gurley candles were inexpensive. The -inch figures were sold for decades for $0.10 each, in packs of two for $0.29, and threes for $0.49. Individual larger sizes rarely exceeded $0.99. Tavern and Gurley candles were primarily sold at dime stores such as Ben Franklin's and Woolworth's, though they could also be found at larger stores such as Macy's. Sales continued to rise throughout the 1950s and peaked in the late 1960s. By the late 1970s the company was in decline.

Today, Gurley Novelty candles are popular collectibles. By far the most popular are the Halloween and Christmas candles, though demand has recently increased for Thanksgiving and Easter candles as well. The company's line of Glow Candles were the company's most expensive products.  They were never a big seller and today are rare.

Reproductions
Several years ago the Gurley candle molds were purchased by the Vermont Country Store, which has begun reproducing them.

References

Candlemakers
Companies based in Buffalo, New York
Privately held companies based in New York (state)